Włodzimierz Press (born 13 May 1939, in Lwów, Poland (now Lviv, Ukraine)) is a Polish theatre and dubbing actor and screenwriter, most notable for playing Grigorij Saakaszwili in the TV series Czterej pancerni i pies.

Born into a Polish Jewish family. He graduated from National Academy of Dramatic Art in 1963, and later joined the People's Theatre. Since 1992 he has performed at the Studio Theatre in Warsaw.

In 1963, Press also made his theatrical debut. His debut film falls on the year 1963 for the film Rozwodów nie będzie, and as a writer he made his debut in 1970 in the film Na dobranoc.

He is most popular for his role in the television series Czterej pancerni i pies as the Georgian Grigorij  "Grześ" Saakaszwili. He also has done dubbing for Polish versions of shows such as the Looney Tunes, The Smurfs and Curious George.

1939 births
Living people
Polish male actors
Actors from Lviv
20th-century Polish Jews
21st-century Polish Jews